Alison Fraser (born in Natick, Massachusetts) is an American actress, voice actress and singer who has appeared on Broadway, Off-Broadway, and in television and film. In concert, she has performed at such venues as Carnegie Hall, The White House, Town Hall, The Brooklyn Botanic Garden, The Tisch Center for the Arts, The Folger Shakespeare Library, The Wilma, The Emelin, Joe's Pub, 54 Below, and Symphony Space.

Career
Fraser is a two-time Tony Award nominee for The Secret Garden and Romance/Romance,
 a Drama Desk Award nominee for both The Secret Garden, and First Daughter Suite and a Carbonell Award winner for Romance/Romance. Fraser is a Callaway Award-winner for Heartbreak House.

She played "Tessie Tura" in the New York City Center and Broadway productions of Gypsy starring Patti LuPone under the direction of Arthur Laurents.

She was the first ever recipient of Philadelphia's Barrymore Award for Best Actress for her portrayal of "The Blonde" in Marion Adler, Scott Wentworth and Craig Boehmler's film noir musical, Gunmetal Blues under the direction of Jiri Zizka.  She reprised the role of "The Blonde" in Gunmetal Blues opposite Patrick Quinn at the George Street Playhouse. She returned there to play "Diana" in Lend Me a Tenor, directed by David Saint.

She was the original "Trina" (Marvin's ex-wife) in William Finn's March of the Falsettos and In Trousers (Playwrights Horizons). She also did vocal orchestrations for both shows. She played "Miss Drumgoole" in Todd Rundgren's adaptation of Joe Orton's Up Against It (New York Shakespeare Festival), "Uta" in Charles Busch and Rusty Magee's The Green Heart (Manhattan Theatre Club), "Connie"/"Petula"/"Brenda" in Beehive at the Village Gate, and "Marion Ames" in Swingtime Canteen. In 1988, she appeared on Broadway in Romance/Romance, a musical starring herself and Quantum Leap star, Scott Bakula. For her dual-role as Josefine/Monica, Fraser received her first Tony Award Nomination. In 1991, Fraser appeared in The Secret Garden, a musical based on the children's story by Frances Hodgson Burnett. For originating the role of Martha, Fraser earned a second Tony Award Nomination. The Secret Garden also featured Mandy Patinkin, Daisy Eagan, John Cameron Mitchell and Rebecca Luker. Fraser stars in the one-woman show A Tennessee Williams Songbook conceived and directed by David Kaplan with musical direction by Allison Leyton-Brown. The show premiered at The Tennessee Williams Festival in Williams' birthplace of Columbus, Mississippi and went on to great acclaim at the annual Provincetown Tennessee Williams Festival. An original cast album titled Tennessee Williams: Words and Music was released on Sh-K-Boom Records in 2013.

Fraser portrayed the flamboyant but clueless "Babs Caplan" on the award-winning PBS series, Between the Lions. She has appeared on the TV series Gotham, High Maintenance, Smash, Law and Order: Special Victims Unit, Happy!, and Third Watch. She played the recurring roles of "Aunt Heidi" in the award-winning web-series Jack in a Box, written and produced by Michael Cyril Creighton, and "Veronica Bailey" on Wesley Taylor and Mitchell Jarvis’s It Could Be Worse (the latter web series was broadcast on Pivot and was later picked up by Hulu).

Her feature films include Socks and Bonds, Family Games, Blowtorch, Commentary, Jack and His Friends (with Sam Rockwell), Me and Him, Mixing Nia, In the Blood, The Mice War, Tommy Battles the Silver Sea Dragon, and The Thing About My Folks. She can also be seen in the Bright Eyes music video for their song, First Day of My Life, directed by her Secret Garden co-star, John Cameron Mitchell. She authored an interview with Anthony Newley which was published in Time Out. Fraser also appeared in video games Grand Theft Auto IV, Grand Theft Auto V and Mafia III.

She has made three solo albums, A New York Romance, Men in My Life and Tennessee Williams: Words and Music.

In 2004, Fraser sang the National Anthem at Fenway Park.

In 2009, Arthur Laurents cast Fraser in an original play, Come Back, Come Back, Wherever You Are which premiered at the George Street Playhouse. The play was directed by Laurents himself and featured Tony-winning actress, Shirley Knight. Also with Knight, Fraser appeared in the 2012 world premiere of Tennessee Williams' final full-length play In Masks Outrageous and Austere.

In 2010, playwright and performer Charles Busch cast Fraser in his new comedy, The Divine Sister, a play satirizes the cinematic portrayal of nuns. Fraser played Sister Walburga.  Fraser then originated the role of Arsinoe in David Ives' comedy The School For Lies at Classic Stage Company.

On December 16, 2013, Fraser joined the First National Tour of Wicked in the role of Madame Morrible.

In 2015, Fraser appeared in four episodes of the Showtime television series Happyish as both Ma Keebler and Boots.

From October 6 to November 22, 2015, Fraser performed in the world premiere of Michael John LaChiusa's musical First Daughter Suite at the Public Theater, in the roles of Nancy Reagan and Betty Ford. For her performance, Fraser received nominations for both the Lucille Lortel Award and Drama Desk Award for Outstanding Featured Actress in a Musical.

In the fall of 2017, Fraser performed a limited run of playwright Aaron Mark's new play Squeamish. The one woman show was presented by All For One Theater (AFO) at Theatre Row's Beckett Theatre. Squeamish ran October 6 – November 11, 2017. For Squeamish, Fraser received a 2018 Outer Critics Circle nomination for Outstanding Solo Performance.

In April 2021, AudioFile named Fraser a recipient of its Earphones Award for her audiobook narration of Alexander Nemerov's novel, Fierce Pose.

Personal life
Fraser graduated summa cum laude in spring 2010 from Fordham University, where she now teaches a musical theatre course.

Fraser is the widow of composer and performer Benjamin Rush "Rusty" Magee, with whom she has one son, Nathaniel Fraser Magee, who is an editor in New York City.

Theatre credits
 In Trousers
 March of the Falsettos
 Falsettos
 Lady in the Dark
 Lips Together, Teeth Apart
 Lend Me a Tenor
 Tartuffe
 The Mystery of Edwin Drood
 Secret Garden
 Up Against It
 The Green Heart
 Beehive
 Honk!
 Prodigal
 Lizzie Borden
 Dedication or The Stuff of Dreams
 High School Musical
 A Quarrel of Sparrows
 Gypsy
 Wicked
 Come Back, Come Back, Wherever You Are
 The Divine Sister
 Archy and Mehitabel
 Love, Loss, and What I Wore
 The School For Lies
 A Charity Case
 In Masks Outrageous and Austere
 Love Therapy
 First Daughter Suite
 The Sandbox
 Funnyhouse of a Negro
 Squeamish
 the shards of an honor code junkie
 A Blanket Of Dust
 Heartbreak House
 Steel Magnolias
 Enter Laughing
 Cinderella
 Deathtrap
 Paradise Lost
 Romance/Romance
 Cat on a Hot Tin Roof

Filmography

Film
1988: Me and Him
1992: Jack and His Friends
1997: The Amazing Feats of Young Hercules (voice)
1998: Mixing Nia
2003: The Thing About My Folks
2006: In The Blood
2006: Spectropia
2012: Commentary
2014: Socks and Bonds
2016: Blowtorch
2017: The Mice War (voice)
2017: Family Games
2017: Hard
2018: Tommy Battles the Silver Sea Dragon
2019: The Sound of Silence
2019: Impossible Monsters
2019: In The Campfire Light
2020: It Cuts Deep

Television
1995: Ace Ventura: Pet Detective (voice)
2000–2001: Between the Lions – Babs Caplan
2000–2002: Spy Groove (voice)
2003: Law & Order: Special Victims Unit
2003: Third Watch
2015: Happyish – Boots (voice), Ma Keebler (voice) (2 episodes)
2016: High Maintenance 
2017: Happy! – Mrs. Claws
2018: Gotham – Gertrude Haverstock (Episode ""That's Entertainment")
2023: Blue Bloods (TV series) – Bobbi Gallo

Videogame
2008: Grand Theft Auto IV – Gertrude Leneau, The Crowd of Liberty City
2013: Grand Theft Auto V – Additional Voices
2016: Mafia III – Additional Voices

References

External links
 Official website
 
 
 

American stage actresses
American women singers
American musical theatre actresses
American television actresses
People from Manhattan
Living people
Actresses from New York City
Singers from New York City
Actresses from Massachusetts
Musicians from Massachusetts
People from Natick, Massachusetts
Fordham University alumni
Fordham University faculty
Natick High School alumni
Year of birth missing (living people)
American women academics
21st-century American women